Praestrigites is a genus from the family Strigoceratidae which is included in the ammonitid superfamily Haploceratoidea.

Praestrigites was named by Buckman in 1924, who also that year named the family Strigoceratidae. The genotype is P. praenuntius

Distribution
Praestrigites comes from the Middle Jurassic (Bajocian)  and has been found in Morocco.

References
 Treatise on Invertebrate Paleontology, Part L Ammonoidea, (L271) Geological Society of America and Univ. of Kansas press, 1964

Jurassic ammonites
Jurassic animals of Africa
Haploceratoidea
Ammonitida genera